Mirza Bašić (born 12 July 1991) is a Bosnian professional tennis player. He has won one ATP singles title and is a member of the Bosnia and Herzegovina Davis Cup team.

Bašić reached his first Grand Slam tournament after qualifying for the 2016 Australian Open. He became the second male player representing Bosnia and Herzegovina, after compatriot Damir Džumhur, to reach the main draw of a Grand Slam.

In 2018, Bašić won his first ATP World Tour title at the Sofia Open. He won the tournament as a qualifier.

ATP World Tour Finals

Singles: 1 (1 title)

Challenger and Futures finals

Singles: 17 (9–8)

Doubles: 8 (3–5)

Singles performance timeline

Current as far as the 2022 Wimbledon Championships.

Davis Cup

   indicates the outcome of the Davis Cup match followed by the score, date, place of event, the zonal classification and its phase, and the court surface.

References

External links
 
 
 

1991 births
Living people
Bosnia and Herzegovina male tennis players
Sportspeople from Sarajevo
Tennis players at the 2016 Summer Olympics
Olympic tennis players of Bosnia and Herzegovina